The Times Record (also known as the Bath-Brunswick Times Record) is an independently-owned daily newspaper published five days a week that covers the Mid Coast region of Maine. Operating out of Brunswick, the paper was founded in 1967 as a result of a merger between two historic newspapers, the Brunswick Record and the Bath Daily Times.

Today, it is part of MaineToday Media publications, and is an affiliate of the state's largest news-gathering organization, RFB Enterprises, which includes newspapers such as the Portland Press Herald.

History

The first publication of The Times Record was published in 1967. The newspaper was a merger of the Brunswick Record, with a print circulation of 7,500 daily papers, and the Bath Daily Times, with a daily circulation of 3,500, for a total of 11,000 daily customers. The Brunswick Record was first published in November 1902 and the Bath Daily Times begun in 1869.

The Bath Daily Times can be traced back to the year . Up until the 1890s, they had many name changes and mergers dating back to that time. Nichols began publishing a page of Brunswick news in the Bath Independent, a weekly companion to the Bath Daily Times. In 1902, due to the success of his entries in the Bath publication, Nichols started a new paper, the Brunswick Record.

In the following 60 years, Nichols oversaw the operations of the Bath Daily Times and his son-in-law, Paul Niven, managed the Brunswick Record. After Nichols passed away, Niven's brother, Cam Niven, took over the Bath Daily Times. On February 6, 1967, the two papers merged and became The Times Record.

The Times Record started out as an afternoon daily newspaper, delivering Monday through Fridays, and was first called the Bath-Brunswick Times Record. There competition, The Portland Press Herald (later to become a sister organization), delivered in the mornings and they didn't want to compete with there large circulation numbers.

Sample News Group

2008 was the middle of the Great Recession, which was a result of the housing bubble. During this time many newspapers went out of business or were bought out by bigger corporations.

In , The Times Record was bought by Sample News Group, an organization that owned the Journal Tribune in Biddeford, Maine, as well as a string of papers in Pennsylvania. Douglas Niven, of the original Niven family, remained on the board of directors and Chris Miles, a partner at Sample News Group took  over day-to-day operations.

In 2008, The new company asked the state of Maine for a bond to purchase the publishing company that The Times Record used for printing their papers, Alliance Press.

RFB Enterprises

In 2012, The Times Record sold its printing division, Alliance Press, to Reade Brower under the name RFB Enterprises. out of Rockland, Maine and moved the presses to a new building at 3 Business Parkway, in Brunswick. As part of the restructuring, past-due property taxes were paid off.

On April 1, 2018, The Times Record, as a whole, was sold to RFB Enterprises. In 2019, Alliance Press moved out of its Brunswick facility and merged with MaineToday Media's new printing press in South Portland, Maine.

Brower has consolidated six of Maine's seven daily newspapers, as well as 21 weekly newspapers, under his ownership.

Online
During the beginning years of the Internet, newspapers such as The Times Record placed their articles online for free. This led in a decline in newspaper sales. After the recession of 2008, the paper closed its Bath location. In the preceding years, when RFB Enterprises purchased the company, the papers website would be transferred to the Portland Press Herald's online pay service.

On March 1, 2021, The Times Record stopped producing physical newspapers on Mondays, having at this time, four daily papers delivered Tuesday through Fridays, with online editions Monday through Friday.

Editorial policy

The MaineToday editorial board announced (via centralmaine.com) in their August 31, 2014 editorial that they would no longer endorse candidates for political office, citing a desire to avoid appearing partisan. They stated that they would continue to take positions on referendums, people's veto, and bond questions.

References

External links

Mass media in Cumberland County, Maine
Newspapers published in Maine
Organizations based in Brunswick, Maine